MiG-29 Fulcrum is a combat flight simulation game released by Novalogic in September 1998. It uses the same game engine as F-16 Multirole Fighter, and both were reissued together in 2001 as a double-disc edition named Jet Pack. The game was re-released in 2009 on Steam.

References

External links
 
Archive of Review at Flight Sim Review Zone

1998 video games
Combat flight simulators
Video games developed in the United States
Windows games
Windows-only games
NovaLogic games